The Online Film Critics Society Award for Best Foreign Language Film (Best Film Not in the English Language) is an annual film award given by the Online Film Critics Society to honor the best foreign language film of the year.

Winners

1990s

2000s

2010s

2020s

References

Film awards for Best Foreign Language Film
Lists of films by award